Olympus FE-310 is a digital camera made by Olympus Corporation. It was released February 2008.

Specifications
Compression
 "Fine" and "Normal" compression settings

Lens
 6.2 – 31 mm (37 – 185 mm equivalent in 35 mm photography)
 9 Lenses in 7 Groups
 3 Aspherical Lenses

Zoom
 5x optical zoom
 4x digital zoom

Image sensor
 8 Megapixels (effective)
 1/2.5" CCD (1.0 cm)

Display
 2,5" (6.4 cm) LCD
 Approx. 154,000 dots 2 steps Brightness Adjustment

Memory
 20.5MB Internal Memory
 Expandable to 2GB with a xD-Picture Card

ISO Sensitivity
 Auto, 80, 100, 200, 400, 640 (equivalent)

References

External links
 American Olympus Corp. website
 Global Olympus Corp. website (archived in 2009) 

FE-310
Cameras introduced in 2008